Teresa E. Reilly (born June 26, 1958) is an American politician from Maryland from the Republican Party. She is currently a member of the Maryland House of Delegates from District 35B, representing northern Cecil and Harford counties.

Early life and career
Reilly was born in Ohio on June 26, 1958, and later moved to Essex, Maryland, where she attended Kenwood Senior High School. She is a former bank officer. She is married to James J. Reilly, a clerk of the Harford County Circuit Court, and has one child.

Reilly entered politics in 1997 by becoming a member of the Republican Club of Harford County, serving on its board of directors from 1997 to 2012. She also served as the vice chair of the Harford County Republican Central Committee from 2002 to 2014. From 2008 to 2013, she served as the chief of staff to former delegate H. Wayne Norman Jr. She is currently a member of the Republican Club of Cecil County. Reilly applied to fill a vacancy left by the resignation of former state senator J. Robert Hooper, who had resigned for health reasons in 2007.

Reilly previously served on the board of directors for the Liriodendron Foundation. She is a current member of the Maryland Horse Council, Maryland Farm Bureau, and the National Rifle Association, and currently serves on the Bainbridge Development Advisory Board and the Local Video Lottery Development Council of Cecil County.

In the legislature
Reilly was elected to the Maryland House of Delegates in 2014, succeeding H. Wayne Norman Jr., who opted to run for Maryland Senate. She was sworn in on January 14, 2015. From 2015 to 2018, Reilly served as the Deputy Minority Whip.

In 2018, following the sudden death of state senator H. Wayne Norman Jr., the Maryland Republican Party eyed Reilly as his successor. However, she had already filed for re-election to the House of Delegates at the time of Norman's death, leading to the nomination of Jason C. Gallion.

Committee assignments
 Health and Government Operations Committee, 2019–present (health occupations & long-term care subcommittee, 2020–present; public health & minority health disparities subcommittee, 2020–present)
 Rules and Executive Nominations Committee, 2021–present
 Ways and Means Committee, 2015–2019 (election law subcommittee, 2015–2019; revenues subcommittee, 2015–2019)

Other memberships
 House Chair, Harford County Delegation, 2017–present
 Maryland Veterans Caucus, 2015–present
 Women Legislators of Maryland, 2015–present (executive board, at large, 2016–2017)
 Maryland Military Installation Legislative Caucus, 2017–present

Electoral history

Awards
 Outstanding Voluntary Service Award, Helping Hands Across the County, Baltimore County Department of Social Services, 1994
 Outstanding Employer, Farmers Bank, 1997
 Pachyderm Award, Republican Club of Harford County, 2000
 Voter Registration Award, Harford County Young Republicans, 2010
 C. Kenneth Beattie Chairman's Award, Republican Central Committee of Harford County, 2010

References

Republican Party members of the Maryland House of Delegates
Living people
Place of birth missing (living people)
1958 births
21st-century American women politicians
21st-century American politicians